Wirth Peninsula is a broad ice-covered peninsula,  long, between Eltanin Bay and Fladerer Bay in Ellsworth Land, Antarctica. Mapped by United States Geological Survey (USGS) from surveys and U.S. Navy air photos, 1961–66. Named by Advisory Committee on Antarctic Names (US-ACAN) for Captain Laurence Wirth, commander of USNS Eltanin on Antarctic cruises, September 1966-November 1967.

Peninsulas of Ellsworth Land